Andrey Yakovlevich Dashkov (Russian: Андрей Яковлевич Дашков) was the first Russian ambassador to the United States. He was born in 1775 in St. Petersburg. In 1807, diplomatic relations were formally established between the Russian Empire and the United States, and in 1808 he was appointed by Tsar Aleksandr I as the Russian consul general and chargé d'affaires to the United States. He arrived in Philadelphia in the same year, was later appointed ambassador, and served until 1817. He died on June 21, 1831 in Stockholm.

War of 1812 
During the War of 1812, the White House door keeper gave Ambassador Dashkov the key to the White House as the American government fled the capital city.

References

Ambassadors of the Russian Empire to the United States
1775 births
1831 deaths
Diplomats from Saint Petersburg